Blake James Wheeler (born August 31, 1986) is an American professional ice hockey player for the Winnipeg Jets of the National Hockey League (NHL). He was drafted by the Phoenix Coyotes in the first round, fifth overall, in the 2004 NHL Entry Draft. Wheeler was born in Plymouth, Minnesota, but grew up in Robbinsdale, Minnesota. After failing to come to terms on a contract with the Phoenix Coyotes, he signed with the Boston Bruins as a free agent.

Playing career

Amateur

Wheeler attended Breck School his freshman year through his junior year. There, during his junior year, Wheeler had his breakout season, putting up a state-high 45 goals and 55 assists in 2003–04. He led his team to a Class A State Hockey Championship that season, and scored a hat trick in the final game.

Wheeler opted to play his senior year in the United States Hockey League (USHL) with the Green Bay Gamblers. After playing one season with the Gamblers, Wheeler attended the University of Minnesota. In 2005–06, his freshman year with the Minnesota Golden Gophers, he recorded 23 points in 39 games, playing alongside future Boston Bruins teammate Phil Kessel.

In the 2007 WCHA Final Five tournament, Wheeler recorded a hat trick in a 4–2 win in the semifinal game against the University of Wisconsin–Madison. In the championship game, Wheeler scored the game-winning goal in a 3–2 overtime win against the North Dakota Fighting Sioux. The play was featured on ESPN's SportsCenter and quickly gained notoriety for its similarity to the game-winning goal in the 1979 NCAA Championship Game, scored by Minnesota's Neal Broten, also against North Dakota. Wheeler was named the tournament MVP.

Early in the 2007–08 season, following injuries to Ryan Stoa and Mike Howe, Wheeler was named an alternate captain for the Golden Gophers and recorded 35 points in 44 games. At the end of the season, four years after he was drafted, Wheeler had yet to come to a contract agreement with the Coyotes. Given the option, Wheeler elected to become an unrestricted free agent despite a maximum entry-level contract offer from the club.

Professional

Boston Bruins (2008–2011)
After the Phoenix Coyotes were not able to come to terms with Wheeler, on July 1, 2008, Wheeler signed an entry-level contract with the Boston Bruins. The Coyotes received a compensatory second-round pick as a result of his signing elsewhere. On October 7, the Bruins made their final cuts for the 2008–09 season and Wheeler remained with the NHL club. Two days later, on October 9, Wheeler scored his first NHL goal, in his NHL debut, against goaltender Peter Budaj of the Colorado Avalanche. Wheeler then collected his first NHL hat trick the next month on November 6, against the Toronto Maple Leafs.

Being named to the 2009 NHL YoungStars Game to represent the rookies, he earned Game MVP honors after a four-goal effort to beat the sophomores 9–5. After being hit by a puck in practice during the 2009 pre-season, Wheeler added a visor to his helmet.

Atlanta Thrashers / Winnipeg Jets (2011–present)

On February 18, 2011, Wheeler, along with Mark Stuart, was traded by Boston to the Atlanta Thrashers for Boris Valábik and Rich Peverley. On July 18, 2011, Wheeler signed a two-year, $5.1 million deal after the Thrashers were relocated and renamed the Winnipeg Jets. In the inaugural 2011–12 season with the Jets, he led the team in scoring with a career-high 64 points in 80 games. With the 2012–13 season delayed due to the NHL lockout and in order to keep game shape, Wheeler signed in Europe with EHC München of the Deutsche Eishockey Liga (DEL) in Germany on October 28, 2012.

In July 2013, Wheeler avoided arbitration by signing a contract for six years, $33.6 million, which carried an annual cap hit of $5.6 million per season. He became the third-highest paid Jets player behind defensemen Tobias Enström and Dustin Byfuglien, and he was signed through to the 2018–19 season. On August 31, 2016, Wheeler was named the new team captain of the Jets. Wheeler was named to his first NHL All-Star game on January 10, 2018, for the 2018 NHL All-Star Game, finished the regular season with a career best 91 points and lead the league in assists with 68, tied with Claude Giroux. On April 24, 2018, Wheeler was named a finalist for the Mark Messier Leadership Award.

On September 4, 2018, Wheeler signed a five-year, $41.25 million contract extension with the Jets.

On December 5, 2021, Wheeler played his 1000th NHL game.

On September 16, 2022, the Jets stripped Wheeler of the captaincy, choosing to go without a captain for the 2022–23 season.

Personal life
Wheeler has been politically active on Twitter, often voicing his opposition to Donald Trump. Wheeler first voiced his opposition to Trump in 2017 after Trump said that athletes kneeling during the national anthem should be fired, with Wheeler supporting the First Amendment rights of athletes. In February of 2018, he spoke in favor of gun control, saying that he would be scared to send his children to school in the United States due to the high frequency of school shootings, noting that Canadian gun laws are an advantage to having his family live in Canada during the school year. Following Joe Biden's victory in the 2020 United States presidential election, Wheeler declared that he felt hopeful for the first time in a while, also stating that he was excited for his daughter to see a woman as vice president.

Career statistics

Regular season and playoffs
Bold indicates led league

International

Awards and honors

References

External links

1986 births
Living people
American expatriate ice hockey players in Canada
American men's ice hockey right wingers
Arizona Coyotes draft picks
Atlanta Thrashers players
Boston Bruins players
EHC München players
Green Bay Gamblers players
Ice hockey players from Minnesota
Ice hockey players at the 2014 Winter Olympics
Minnesota Golden Gophers men's ice hockey players
National Hockey League All-Stars
National Hockey League first-round draft picks
Olympic ice hockey players of the United States
People from Plymouth, Minnesota
People from Robbinsdale, Minnesota
Ice hockey people from Winnipeg
Winnipeg Jets players